Playing for the Ashes is a crime novel by Elizabeth George.

References 

1993 American novels
American mystery novels